Jay D. Livingstone is an American politician who has served in the Massachusetts House of Representatives since July 2013. He is a resident of Back Bay, Boston, a member of the Democratic Party. He won a special election to succeed Martha M. Walz, unopposed in the June 25 general election after winning the May 28 primary. He was sworn in July 17, 2013.  He has since won re-election in 2014, 2016, 2018, 2020, and 2022.

Jay was educated in North Attleboro's public schools and worked as a cashier at the town pharmacy while in high school. He was a union factory worker while attending UConn, where he majored in political science and history and graduated with honors. He attended George Washington School of Law and graduated with high honors.

Livingstone was raised in North Attleboro, MA. He has practiced law since 1998, working in public and private practice.  He currently serves as of counsel at the law firm of The Employee Rights Group, LLP.  Jay Livingstone served as an adjunct professor at Northeastern Law School from August 2009 through June 2013.

Jay Livingstone maintains a website for updates regarding his legislative activities and his campaign activities.  He also sends a regular email newsletter.

See also
 2019–2020 Massachusetts legislature
 2021–2022 Massachusetts legislature

References

External links
 Jay Livingstone (official House site)

Living people
Democratic Party members of the Massachusetts House of Representatives
Politicians from Boston
21st-century American politicians
Year of birth missing (living people)
People from Beacon Hill, Boston
People from North Attleborough, Massachusetts
University of Connecticut alumni
George Washington University Law School alumni